Blake Taaffe (born 21 April 1999) is an Australian professional rugby league footballer who plays as a  and  for the South Sydney Rabbitohs in the NRL.

Early life
Taafe was educated at Tuggerah Lakes Secondary College.

Playing career

2021
In round 15 of the 2021 NRL season, Taaffe made his first grade debut for South Sydney against the Brisbane Broncos in a 46–0 victory.
Taafe played a total of eight games for South Sydney in the 2021 NRL season including the club's 2021 NRL Grand Final defeat against Penrith.

2022
Taaffe played a total of ten games for South Sydney in the 2022 NRL season. Taaffe did not feature in any of South Sydney's finals matches as the club reached the preliminary final before losing to Penrith.

References

External links
South Sydney Rabbitohs profile

1999 births
Living people
Australian rugby league players
Indigenous Australian rugby league players
Rugby league fullbacks
Rugby league halfbacks
Rugby league players from Sydney
South Sydney Rabbitohs players